
Gmina Węgorzyno is an urban-rural gmina (administrative district) in Łobez County, West Pomeranian Voivodeship, in north-western Poland.

The gmina contains part of the protected area called Ińsko Landscape Park. The river Brzeźnicka Węgorza is within the gmina.

Villages
Apart from the town of Węgorzyno, Gmina Węgorzyno contains the villages and settlements of Brzeźniak, Chwarstno, Cieszyno, Kraśnik Łobeski, Lesięcin, Mielno, Mieszewo, Podlipce, Przytoń, Runowo, Sarnikierz, Sielsko, Stare Węgorzynko, Sulice, Trzebawie, Wiewiecko, Winniki and Zwierzynek.

Neighbouring gminas
Gmina Węgorzyno is bordered by the gminas of Chociwel, Dobra, Drawsko Pomorskie, Ińsko, Łobez and Radowo Małe.

References
Polish official population figures 2006

Wegorzyno
Łobez County